is a Japanese football player who plays for Tochigi SC in J2 League.

Club statistics
Updated to 23 February 2017.

References

External links
Profile at Fujieda MYFC

J. League (#2)

1990 births
Living people
Association football people from Tokyo
Japanese footballers
J2 League players
J3 League players
Japan Football League players
Yokohama FC players
FC Ryukyu players
Matsumoto Yamaga FC players
Fujieda MYFC players
Vonds Ichihara players
Tochigi SC players
Association football defenders